Kevin Stephen Johnson (born 3 July 1942) is an Australian singer-songwriter. Popular in the 1970s, his biggest hit is "Rock and Roll (I Gave You the Best Years of My Life)", which peaked at No. 4 on the Australian Kent Music Report Singles Chart in 1973 (as well as reaching the UK Top 40). He also had a top 20 hit with "Bonnie Please Don't Go" (aka "She's Leavin'") in 1971. "Rock and Roll" is one of the most covered songs written by an Australian with 27 different artists recording the song in 1975 alone. Covers of "Rock and Roll (I Gave You the Best Years of My Life)" came from fellow Australians, Col Joye and Dig Richards, and from international artists, Mac Davis, Terry Jacks, Gary Glitter, Joe Dassin (in French), The Cats and Tom Jones. Davis' rendition became the highest charting version on the Billboard Hot 100, reaching No. 15 in 1975.

Early life 

Kevin Stephen Johnson was born on and grew up in Tungamull, which is between the Capricorn Coast and Rockhampton, Queensland. He is the only son of Richard Johnson (timber contractor) and Elinor Johnson (post office, telephone exchange operator). Elinor was also a violinist and gave Johnson lessons but he showed little interest. He bought a guitar in his late teens and began his music career by singing in local beer gardens, then joining the Candymen on lead vocals and rhythm guitar. From the early 1960s he worked for the Queensland Department of Roads as a clerk; playing and singing at night and writing songs in his spare time. Some of his songs came to the notice of rock and roll artist, Col Joye, who signed Johnson to his publishing company. In September 1966 Col Joye and the Joy Boys had a hit with "Mary Anne", which had been written by Johnson.

Career

1967-1971: Career Beginnings
In 1967 Johnson relocated to Sydney and recorded his first single, "Hayman Island" on Joye's ATA label in January. He followed with "Woman You Took My Life" in April 1968 but neither single had any chart success. Aside from his music career Johnson also worked for the Registrar-General's Department of New South Wales. "Woman You Took My Life" was later recorded by Tom Jones, and by Vince Hill. In 1969 Johnson signed with independent label, Sweet Peach. His debut album, In the Quiet Corners of My Mind, was released in that year. It was recorded at the Adelaide Studios of Gamba with Jimmy Stewart as producer and Lewandowski as engineer. In February 1971 he issued his first hit single, "Bonnie Please Don't Go" aka "She's Leavin'", which peaked at No. 12 in Melbourne, No. 2 in Sydney, and No. 15 on the Go-Set National Top 60. It remained on the Go-Set charts for a total of 25 weeks; it was listed at No. 22 on their end of year chart; and No. 7 for Top Australian Singles of the year.

In 1971, Johnson won the Male Vocalist Single Award for his self-composed single, "Bonnie Please Don't Go".

1972-1990:  "Rock and Roll" and career peak
Kevin Johnson changed labels to the United States-based Tree International, owners of Dial Records, and for two years he wrote songs for other artists while vainly attempting to record his own material. He later recalled "Because I'd signed with an American company I couldn't record here ... two years writing and bashing my head against a brick wall". In September 1973 he issued "Rock and Roll I Gave You the Best Years of My Life". It peaked at No. 10 in Melbourne, and at No. 4 on the Australian Kent Music Report Singles Chart.

The lyrics describe a musician recalling his childhood dream of being a star and follows his life through his musical work, with some close breaks until he is faced with the ultimate realisation that he is not destined to become a star. It ends on an upbeat note from the would-be celebrity proclaiming "I thank the lord for giving me the little that I knew". Johnson based the early verses on his own life and the later verses "on others I've known. I always draw on things I know, things around me, on everyday life for my songs". He told Australasian Performing Right Association representative, Debbie Kruger, in March 2002, that he had written it in two days:

He had become dissatisfied with his US record label, Dial Records, in Nashville, Tennessee and told them he was about to leave. However he was informed that other artists had already recorded his song, so he quickly recorded and released his own version on the Australian-based Good Thyme label through Festival. Kruger noted that "[the song] reflected his frustration with his own stagnation, and the futile attempts of Australian artists trying to break into America or England". In the US Johnson's single was issued on Mainstream Records, it went to No. 73 on the Billboard singles chart in 1973. It was picked up by producer Jonathan King and released in the United Kingdom on his UK Records label in 1974 when it reached No. 23 on the UK Singles Chart the following year. The song reached number 8 in the Irish charts on its original release in 1974, returning to number 18 under the UK Records release in January 1975.

At the 1974 Australian Radio Record Awards, "Rock And Roll (I Gave You the Best Years of My Life)," won the Male Vocalist Single award and his self-produced album under the same name was awarded the Male Vocalist Album.

According to rock music historian, Ian McFarlane, it is one of the most covered songs written by an Australian with 27 different artists recording it in 1975 alone. Covers include fellow Australians, Col Joye and Digby Richards, and international artists, Mac Davis, Terry Jacks, Gary Glitter, Joe Dassin (in French), The Cats and Tom Jones. Some cover artists, including Davis, leave out the lyric "... I'd never be a star" for a happier ending. Johnson believes "There were a few people who wouldn't sing [that line] because in their minds they were big stars". Others, like Glitter, leave out the upbeat ending in the Johnson version for a more sombre ending. Jacks' version went to No. 97 in the US in 1974 – it reached No. 22 in Canada – and Davis' rendition became the highest US charting version, reaching No. 15 in 1975.

In February 1974 Kevin Johnson issued his second solo album, Rock and Roll I Gave You the Best Years of My Life, on the Good Thyme label. In the next year he supported an Australian tour by Roberta Flack. He released a succession of singles on the label and followed in August 1976 with a third album, Man of the 20th Century. For that album he used session musicians including Russell Dunlop on drums; Wayne Findlay on keyboards; Jim Kelly, Kirk Lorange, Mark Punch, and Rory O'Donoghue on guitars; and Tim Partridge on bass guitar. Later that year he toured Europe and appeared on a TV special broadcast into France, Italy, Germany and Switzerland. His single, "Grab the Money and Run", appeared on the Irish charts.

Johnson toured Europe again in 1977. He also signed with Festival Records' offshoot Infinity to issue further singles and an album, Journeys, which was released in 1978. Additional albums followed including Best of Kevin Johnson (a compilation album, 1979), Night Rider (1981), Spirit of the Times (1985), Now and Then (compilation, 1992) and The Sun will Shine Again (September 1996).

In 1996 Johnson re-wrote "Rock 'N' Roll" for the Australian Football League (AFL) as their official Centenary Song, retitled "Aussie Rules I Thank You for the Best Years of Our Lives". It was used as an introductory theme before AFL games during that season. During the late 1990s it was used as the closing theme for Foster's Aussie Rules, a US highlights show.

2000s: JAM
Kevin Johnson formed a trio, JAM (initialism for Johnson Ashdown McClellan) with Doug Ashdown ("Winter in America" aka "Leave Love Enough Alone") and Mike McClellan ("Song and Dance Man"). They toured Australia through the 2000s.

Personal life 

In 1967 Kevin Johnson married Jill and by April 1975 the couple had two children.

Discography

Studio albums

Australian Compilation albums

Singles

Awards

Australian Radio Records Awards

|-
|rowspan="2" | 1974
| Rock 'N' Roll (I Gave You the Best Years of My Life)
| Album
| 
|-
| "Rock 'N' Roll (I Gave You the Best Years of My Life)"
| Single
| 
|}

References

External links
 

1942 births
Australian singer-songwriters
Living people
People from Rockhampton
Australian guitarists
Rhythm guitarists
Australian pop singers
Musicians from Queensland
Australian male guitarists
Australian male singer-songwriters